Vettweiß (alternative spelling: Vettweiss) is a municipality in the district of Düren in the state of North Rhine-Westphalia, Germany. It is located approximately 10 km south-east of Düren.

Division of the municipality
Vettweiß consists of 11 villages:
 Vettweiß with Kettenheim
 Froitzheim with Frangenheim
 Ginnick
 Soller
 Jakobwüllesheim
 Kelz
 Lüxheim
 Gladbach with Mersheim
 Müddersheim
 Disternich
 Sievernich

Politics

Town council 

 CDU: 15 seats
 BI: 5 seas
 SPD: 6 seats
 Alliance 90/The Greens: 2 seats

(Elections in May 2014)

Mayor 
Joachim Kunth was elected mayor in September 2015, and re-elected in September 2020.

References

External links

Düren (district)